Following is an incomplete list of major cemeteries in Lahore, Pakistan.

 Gora Cemetery
 Miani Sahib Graveyard
 Mominpura Graveyard
 Taxali Gate Cemetery

Lahore-related lists
Lahore